Time Will Die and Love Will Bury It is the fifth studio album by English experimental rock band Rolo Tomassi, released on 2 March 2018 by Holy Roar Records.

Background and recording 
Synthesiser player and vocalist, James Spence had stated in interviews he wanted to make a "clean break" from the "dark, monochromatic" style of their 2015 album Grievances. He said that "I felt like I’d overcome everything that we'd written within that record. For me, it was about moving forwards and taking things to a slightly happier place".

Time Will Die and Love Will Bury It was recorded, like their previous album Grievances, at The Ranch in Southampton. James Spence noted how during the writing when other band members were producing a lot of ideas, Cayford was struggling to output similar amounts. However this frustration manifested in the song "Rituals" and helped him to push past. Guitarist Chris Cayford's and drummer Tom Pitts' system of developing music was that Cayford would send Pitts a MIDI file with his guitar work with ideas for drumming he wanted to go with it. Pitts said in an interview how he would experiment on music software such as Cubase and have ambitious ideas that he struggled to play, "I’ll write something ridiculously impossible, try to play it and then have to dumb it down a bit. We go back and forth. A lot of it is done on MIDI where I can get it exact and then learn it from there".

The title of the album Time Will Die and Love Will Bury It is derived from a poem by Richard Brautigan.

Composition 
The title of the album Time Will Die and Love Will Bury It has been an ambiguously interpreted statement by different members of the band which has influenced diverse song writing- while James Spence saw it as a positive title, Chris Cayford saw its darker connotations. The music of the album has been described as mathcore, post-rock, experimental rock, with heavy elements of ambient music.

Release and promotion
Rolo Tomassi had a minimal tour schedule in 2017 which featured appearances at the Two Thousand Trees and Tech Fest festivals in the UK, unveiling new material with a promotional website, lovewillburyit.com. On 5 November 2017 the band released the first single from Time Will Die and Love Will Bury It, "Rituals", on BBC Radio 1, with a music video accompanying it the next day. A few days after the single's release, the band performed one headline show in London at the Borderline with support from label mates Conjurer, where they performed "Rituals" and "The Hollow Hour". On 12 February 2018 the second single "Aftermath" was released.

The album was released on Holy Roar Records in the United Kingdom on 2 March 2018. Prior to its release, the album was streamed on The Independent's website.

During the recording of Time Will Die and Love Will Bury It Cayford used software like Ableton Live to coordinate lights to be used during live performances to synchronise with the music. The band embarked on their first tour since the album was released in April across the UK and mainland Europe. The band performed at a series of European festivals, a six date UK tour in November with Blood Command and Cassus, then a United States tour November and December supporting The Number Twelve Looks Like You with Arsonists Get All The Girls.

Reception 

At Metacritic, which assigns a rating out of 100 to reviews from mainstream critics, Time Will Die and Love Will Bury It has received an average score of 92, based on 7 reviews, indicating "universal acclaim"; it is the second highest-scoring album of 2018 on the site.

Kerrang! gave the album a perfect score, citing it as "a classic" and "a hugely satisfying listen, with the longer songs in particular allowing the band free rein to indulge every experimental urge." NME was similar in its assessment, saying "whereas Grievances was so bleak you could feel the dull ache of its bruises, Time Will Die’s increased use of light and space ensures it stands alone in an arsenal of already exceptional records."

The Line of Best Fit gave the album a 7.5/10, concluding that "Rolo Tomassi are a band still looking to push themselves further forward creatively, while remaining just as focused on retaining the dramatic core of their sound that has long set them apart from any contemporaries."

Track listing

Personnel
Credits adapted from the liner notes of Time Will Die and Love Will Bury It.

Rolo Tomassi
 Eva Spence – lead vocals
 James Spence – electronic keyboards, piano and co-lead vocals
 Chris Cayford – electric guitar
 Nathan Fairweather – electric bass guitar
 Tom Pitts – drum kit and backing vocals

Additional personnel
 Lewis Johns – recording, mixing, vocals on "Aftermath"
 Dom Wright – recording, mixing
 Brad Boatright – mastering
 Simon Moody – art, design

Charts

References 
Citations

Rolo Tomassi albums
2018 albums
Alternative metal albums by English artists
Post-rock albums by English artists
Experimental rock albums by English artists